In algebraic topology, Hilton's theorem, proved by ,  states that the loop space of a wedge of spheres is homotopy-equivalent to a product of loop spaces of spheres.

 showed more generally that the loop space of the suspension of a wedge of spaces can be written as an infinite product of loop spaces of suspensions of smash products.

References

1955 in mathematics
Theorems in algebraic topology